Simaa is a Bantu language of Zambia. It was assigned by Guthrie to Bantu group K.30, which Pfouts (2003) established as part of the Kavango–Southwest branch of Bantu. Though not specifically addressed, Simaa may be in that family as well. 

Maho (2009) lists K35 Simaa, K351 Mulonga, K352 Mwenyi, K353 Koma (Makoma), and K354 Imilangu, all covered by ISO code [sie], as distinct but closely related languages.

References

External links 
 ELAR archive of a Preliminary Documentation of Mwenyi

Kavango languages